
Year 147 BC was a year of the pre-Julian Roman calendar. At the time it was known as the Year of the Consulship of Aemilianus and Drusus (or, less frequently, year 607 Ab urbe condita). The denomination 147 BC for this year has been used since the early medieval period, when the Anno Domini calendar era became the prevalent method in Europe for naming years.

Events 
 By place 
Ireland
Corlea Trackway completed.
 Roman Republic 
 Scipio Aemilianus takes command in the Battle of Carthage. 
 In Lusitania, Hispania, the Celtic king Viriathus, rallies Lusitanian resistance to Rome.

 Syria 
 Demetrius II of Syria returns to Syria (approximate date).
 Jonathan Maccabaeus conquers Joppa.

 Greece 
 Macedonia becomes a part of the Roman empire.

Deaths 
 Bo, Chinese empress of the Western Han Dynasty

References